The Western College of Veterinary Medicine (WCVM) is a Canadian veterinary school located in Saskatoon, Saskatchewan.  It is a college within the University of Saskatchewan.

The Western College of Veterinary Medicine (WCVM) opened in 1965, with the first veterinarians graduating in 1969.  WCVM serves the four western provinces of British Columbia, Alberta, Saskatchewan and Manitoba (though the University of Calgary Faculty of Veterinary Medicine opened in 2005 to serve Alberta), as well as the territories of Yukon, Northwest Territories and Nunavut.  WCVM was the second of the English-speaking veterinary colleges to be established in Canada.

The college houses the WCVM Veterinary Medical Centre, which comprises both a small animal and a large animal clinic. The clinics serve a dual purpose:  providing primary and specialized veterinary services to the public, and being a platform for clinical learning for the veterinary students.

See also 
 University of Saskatchewan

References

External links
Western College of Veterinary Medicine

Veterinary schools in Canada
Veterinary
Educational institutions established in 1964
1964 establishments in Saskatchewan